Outdoor Survival was a board game published by Avalon Hill in 1972.

Rules
Outdoor Survival is a hex-based board game played on three interlocking maps.

Publication history
Outdoor Survival was designed by Jim Dunnigan, and published by Avalon Hill in 1972. It comes with three full-color interlocking, folding maps; some cards; and rules. The game became one of Avalon Hill's perennial bestsellers, with its success largely dependent on sales in outdoor gear stores, rather than traditional board game outlets.

Legacy
Gary Gygax made use of Outdoor Survival in Dungeons & Dragons, even listing the game on the "Equipment" list in Volume I of the original 1974 edition of Dungeons & Dragons.

Reception
In a retrospective review of Outdoor Survival in Black Gate, John ONeill said "over time it became one of Avalon Hill's perennial bestsellers. Its success is attributed chiefly to the fact that it was sold outside regular channels — in outdoor equipment shops and the like — and because a whole generation of D&D players apparently thought of it as an essential component of any great wilderness adventure."

Reviews
Jeux & Stratégie #13

References

Avalon Hill games
Board games introduced in 1972
Jim Dunnigan games